Luka Reischl (born 10 February 2004) is an Austrian professional footballer who plays as a forward for 2. Liga club Liefering.

Club career
Reischl made his professional debut for Austrian Second League side Liefering on 25 September 2020 against Wacker Innsbruck. He came on as an 89th-minute substitute for Maurits Kjaergaard as Liefering won 2–0. He scored his first professional goal on 20 November 2020 against Kapfenberger SV as Liefering won 6:1.

Career statistics

Club

References

2004 births
Living people
Austrian footballers
Association football forwards
FC Liefering players
2. Liga (Austria) players